Julián Infante Martín-Nieto (July 17, 1957 – December 4, 2000) was a Spanish guitarist and composer.

Discography

With Tequila 
Matrícula de honor (1978)
Rock and Roll (1979)
Viva Tequila (1980)
Confidencial (1981)
Tequila (1990)
Tequila grandes éxitos (1996)

With Los Rodríguez
Buena suerte (1991)
Disco Pirata (Live 1992)
Sin documentos (1993)
Palabras más, palabras menos (1995)
Hasta luego (Compilation 1996)
Para no olvidar (Compilation 2002)

Musicians from Madrid
1957 births
2000 deaths
20th-century composers
20th-century Spanish musicians
AIDS-related deaths in Spain